Gerald Burrell (6 September 1924 – 25 October 2014) was a professional footballer, who played in the Scottish Football League for St Mirren and Dundee and in the English Football League for Huddersfield Town and Chesterfield during the 1940s and 1950s. He played as an outside right.

He was selected to play for the Third Division North representative team in 1956–57.

References

1924 births
2014 deaths
Association footballers from Belfast
Association footballers from Northern Ireland
Association football wingers
St Mirren F.C. players
Dundee F.C. players
Huddersfield Town A.F.C. players
Chesterfield F.C. players
Scottish Football League players
English Football League players
Dundela F.C. players
Portadown F.C. players